Myrthe or Myrte (both pronounced ) is a Dutch feminine given name, after the evergreen mirte (myrtle) plant. Myrtis was already a common ancient Greek name. People with the name include:

Myrthe Bolt (born 1999), Dutch model
Myrthe Hilkens (born 1979), Dutch journalist
Myrthe Moorrees (born 1994), Dutch footballer
Myrthe Schoenaker (born 1992), Dutch handball player
Myrthe Schoot (born 1988), Dutch volleyball player
Fictional
title character in Myrte of the Demons

References

Dutch feminine given names